Dissanthelium californicum (California dissanthelium, Catalina grass) is a rare species of grass in the family Poaceae. It was originally discovered on Santa Catalina, an island off California's coast in 1847 by U.S. botanist and naturalist William Gambel. It was later identified as growing on Guadalupe Island (off Baja California Peninsula), on San Clemente Island and Catalina Island (both off southern California).

Last seen in 1912, Dissanthelium californicum was generally thought to be extinct, until examples were found on March 29, 2005, by Jenny McCune of the Catalina Island Conservancy on Catalina Island. In 2010, two populations were found on San Clemente Island. It has not reappeared on Guadalupe Island.

See also
 Lazarus taxon

References

  Catalina Island Conservancy Times, Fall 2005

External links
Calflora Database: Dissanthelium californicum (California dissanthelium,  Catalina grass)
Jepson Manual eFlora (TJM2) treatment of Dissanthelium californicum
USDA Plants Profile for Dissanthelium californicum (Catalina grass)
Grass Manual Treatment: Dissanthelium californicum
 Catalina Island Conservancy
 Batnet.com; Dissanthelium californicum

Pooideae
Native grasses of California
Grasses of Mexico
Flora of California
Flora of Baja California
Flora of Mexican Pacific Islands
Natural history of the Channel Islands of California
Natural history of the California chaparral and woodlands
~
Endangered biota of Mexico
Plants described in 1848